Microextrusion is a microforming extrusion process performed at the submillimeter range. Like extrusion, material is pushed through a die orifice, but the resulting product's cross section can fit through a 1mm square. Several microextrusion processes have been developed since microforming was envisioned in 1990. Forward (ram and billet move in the same direction) and backward (ram and billet move in the opposite direction) microextrusion were first introduced, with forward rod-backward cup and double cup extrusion methods developing later. Regardless of method, one of the greatest challenges of creating a successful microextrusion machine is the manufacture of the die and ram. "The small size of the die and ram, along with the stringent accuracy requirement, needs suitable manufacturing processes." Additionally, as Fu and Chan pointed out in a 2013 state-of-the-art technology review, several issues must still be resolved before microextrusion and other microforming technologies can be implemented more widely, including deformation load and defects, forming system stability, mechanical properties, and other size-related effects on the crystallite (grain) structure and boundaries.

Development and use
Microextrusion is an outgrowth of microforming, a science that was in its infancy in the early 1990s. In 2002, Engel et al. expressed that up to that point, only a few research experiments involving micro-deep drawing and extruding processes had been attempted, citing limitations in shearing on billets and difficulties in tool manufacturing and handling. By the mid- to late 2000s, researchers were working on issues such as billet flow, interfacial friction, extrusion force, and size effects, "the deviations from the expected results that occur when the dimension of a workpiece or sample is reduced." Most recently, research into using ultrafine-grained material at higher formation temperatures and applying ultrasonic vibration to the process has pushed the science further. However, before bulk production of microparts such as pins, screws, fasteners, connectors, and sockets using microforming and microextrusion techniques can occur, more research into billet production, transportation, positioning, and ejection are required.

Microextrusion techniques have also been applied to bioceramic and plastic extrusion and the manufacture of components for resorbable and implantable medical devices, from bioresorbable stents to controlled drug release systems.

Microextrusion processes
Like normal macro-level extrusion, several similar microextrusion processes have been described over the years. The most basic processes were forward (direct) and backward (indirect) microextrusion. The ram (which propels the billet forward) and billet both move in the same direction with forward microextrusion, while in backward microextrusion has the ram and billet moving in opposite directions. These in turn have been applied to specialized applications such as the manufacture of microbillet, brass micropins, microgear shafts, and microcondensers. However, other processes have been applied to microextrusion, including forward rod–backward cup extrusion and double cup (one forward, one backward) extrusion.

Strengths and limitations
Strengths of microextrusion over other manufacturing processes include its ability to create very complex cross-sections, preserve chemical properties, condition physical properties, and process materials which are delicate or dependent on physical or chemical properties. However, microextrusion has some limitations, though primarily related to the need for improvement of the relatively young process. Dixit and Das described it thus in 2012:

With the scaling down of dimensions and increasing geometric complexity of objects, currently available technologies and systems may not be able to meet the development needs. New measuring devices, principles and instrumentation, tolerance rules, and procedures have to be developed. Materials databases with detailed information on various materials and their properties/interface properties including microstructures and size effect would be very useful for product innovation and process design. More studies are necessary on micro/nanowear and damages/failures of the micromanufacturing tools. The forming limits for different types of materials at the microlevel must be prescribed. More specific considerations must be incorporated into the design of machines that are scaled down for microforming to meet engineering applications and requirements.

Further reading

References

Forming processes
Medical technology
Pharmaceutical industry